Pak Kwang-ho (born 1949) is a North Korean politician and was director of the Propaganda and Agitation Department. He was replaced by Ri Il-hwan.

References 

Living people
1949 births
Members of the Supreme People's Assembly
Vice Chairmen of the Workers' Party of Korea and its predecessors